Gordon Thomas Collins (26 December 1914 – 3 March 1986) was an English cricketer.  Collins was a right-handed batsman who played occasionally as a wicketkeeper.  He was born at Sunbury-on-Thames, Middlesex.

Collins made his first-class cricket debut for Northamptonshire against Worcestershire in 1937.  He represented the county in 2 further first-class matches in 1937, against Derbyshire and Essex.  In his 3 first-class matches, he scored 44 runs at a batting average of 8.80, with a high score of 17.

In 1947, he joined Cambridgeshire, where he represented the county in the Minor Counties Championship, making his debut for the county against Norfolk.  From 1947 to 1949, he represented the county in 9 matches, with his final appearance coming against Lincolnshire.

Collins died at Manchester on 3 March 1986.

References

External links
Gordon Collins at Cricinfo
Gordon Collins at CricketArchive

1914 births
1986 deaths
People from Sunbury-on-Thames
English cricketers
Northamptonshire cricketers
Cambridgeshire cricketers